Furue is a Hiroden station on Hiroden Miyajima Line, located in Furue-higashi-machi, Nishi-ku, Hiroshima.

Routes
From Furue Station, there is one of Hiroden Streetcar routes.
 Hiroshima Station - Hiroden-miyajima-guchi Route

Connections
█ Miyajima Line

Takasu — Furue — Kusatsu

Around station
Hiroshima Gakuin Junior and Senior High School
Miwa-myojin

History
Opened on August 22, 1922.

See also
Hiroden Streetcar Lines and Routes

References

Furue Station
Railway stations in Japan opened in 1922